Franklin Townsend (March 20, 1933-May 15, 1965), was an American professional wrestler and musician. He was known as Farmer Boy and was dubbed ‘The Singing Wrestler.'

Professional wrestling career 
Townsend began his wrestling career in 1956 in Ohio.
 
During his career he worked in Calgary, Minnesota, New York, Toronto, St. Louis, and Vancouver. Most of his career was spent in Toronto working for Maple Leaf Wrestling from 1957 to 1958, and again in 1961. He teamed with Pat O'Connor and Billy Watson. In 1961 he toured England working for Joint Promotions until 1962. That year he returned to North America working in St. Louis, American Wrestling Association and made his debut in Vancouver as Mr. X. In Vancouver he teamed with Gene Kiniski to win the NWA Canadian Tag Team Championship (Vancouver version) defeating Sandor Kovacs and Dan Miller on February 11, 1963. They dropped the belts to Mitsu Arakawa and Kinji Shibuya a month later.  

In May 1963, Townsend went to Japan as Killer X for Japan Wrestling Association. After the tour in Japan, Townsend retired from wrestling and continued his music career.

Death
On May 15, 1965, Townsend and his yacht crew were preparing to race the yacht, the Dorade, in Puget Sound, Washington. During the race, Townsend fell overboard and is believed to have drowned. His body was never found. He was 32 years old at the time of his disappearance.

Championships and accomplishments 
All-Star Wrestling
NWA Canadian Tag Team Championship (Vancouver version) (1 time) - with Gene Kiniski

Minneapolis Boxing and Wrestling Club
NWA International Tag Team Championship (Minneapolis version) (2 times) - with Butch Levy

Discography

Singles and EPs
1957: If You Believe / Baby, I've Got A Crush On You
1957: ''If You Fall For Me / Find A Love For Me" with the Denny Vaughan Orchestra

See also
 List of premature professional wrestling deaths

References

External links 
 

1933 births
1965 deaths
American male professional wrestlers
Professional wrestlers from New Jersey
People from Camden, New Jersey
Deaths by drowning in the United States
20th-century professional wrestlers